Justin Ashburn (born December 23, 1981) is an American professional stock car racing driver who competed in both the NASCAR Nationwide Series and the ARCA Re/Max Series from 2002 to 2009, driving for the Day Enterprise Racing team in nearly all of his starts in both series.

Racing career
In 1997, Ashburn won the Rookie of the Year award at Highland Rim Speedway and finished fifth in points in the pro-modified series. Two years later, he won the Most Improved Driver award after winning ten races and finishing fourth in points. He then moved on to race at Nashville Fairgrounds in the Winston Racing Series, posting four top-tens in 2001.

Busch Series
Ashburn made his Busch Series debut in 2003, running a second Day Enterprises car. Driving the No. 61 Chevrolet, Ashburn started and finished 42nd at Darlington Raceway. Ashburn failed to finish 11 of 13 starts for the team. His best finish was a 20th-place finish at Nashville Superspeedway in June 2003. Ashburn also made a one-off start for Bost Motorsports, finishing 41st at Michigan Speedway after his Day Enterprises car failed to qualify.

Ashburn moved to the team's primary car, the No. 16, for 2004. However, the team struggled to qualify for races early and had to scale back to a limited schedule. As a result, Ashburn only qualified for eight races in 2004, failing to finish six of them. His best finish was a 29th at Talladega Superspeedway. He also led his first career lap under caution in the July race at Daytona International Speedway.

Ashburn made only one start in 2006, at Talladega. Avoiding a wreck early, Ashburn hung on to the back of the draft and earned his career-best finish of 14th, his first career lead lap finish. In 2007, he ran two races, earning a best finish of 22nd at Talladega. Ashburn made three start and park appearances in 2008, including his debut with the No. 57 Chevrolet owned by Chad Beahr. For 2009, Ashburn made only one appearance, parking after five laps in the Stater Brothers 300 at Auto Club Speedway.

Motorsports career results

NASCAR
(key) (Bold – Pole position awarded by qualifying time. Italics – Pole position earned by points standings or practice time. * – Most laps led.)

Nationwide Series

ARCA Re/Max Series
(key) (Bold – Pole position awarded by qualifying time. Italics – Pole position earned by points standings or practice time. * – Most laps led.)

References

External links
 Driver DB Profile
 

1981 births
ARCA Menards Series drivers
Living people
NASCAR drivers
People from Joelton, Tennessee
Racing drivers from Tennessee